"Paranoia" is a short story by Shirley Jackson first published on August 5, 2013 in The New Yorker long after the authors death in 1965. Jackson's children found the story in her papers in the Library of Congress. It has since been reprinted in Dark Tales (2016).

Background
According to Jackson's son, Laurence Jackson Hyman, in an interview with The New Yorker:

Plot
In Manhattan, businessman Mr. Halloran Beresford, leaves his office happy and jolly after a busy day at work pleased with remembering his wife's birthday. He buys chocolates on the way home and plans to take his wife out to romantic dinner and a show. But his commute to home becomes fraught with panic as he believes someone is stalking him, as other people then seem to be part of the plot. Eventually, he manages to reach home, but then he still may not be safe...

Theme
The story’s title, 'Paranoia', implies that this is all in Mr Beresford’s mind, which is misinterpreting or distorting the world around him.

References

External links
Copy of complete story from The New Yorker
Audiobook
The Horror Show: “Paranoia” by Shirley Jackson

2013 short stories
Works originally published in The New Yorker
Short stories by Shirley Jackson
Manhattan in fiction